Vladimir Yengibaryan (24 April 1932 – 1 February 2013) was a Soviet and Armenian amateur light-welterweight boxer. He was an Olympic champion, three-time European champion and three-time Soviet champion. In 1956 he was named the Honoured Master of Sports of the USSR and awarded the Order of the Red Banner of Labour. During his career he won 255 out of 267 bouts.

Boxing career

Yengibaryan was born as a fourth child. He took up boxing in 1946, training in Yerevan first with Artyom Arutyunov and then with Edward Aristakesyan.

Yengibaryan won a bronze medal in the bantamweight division at the 1951 Soviet Championships, and next year was included to the Soviet national team. He did not compete at the 1952 Summer Olympics due to an injury. Soviet Union debuted in the European Amateur Boxing Championships in 1953, where Yengibaryan won a gold medal in the lightweight division, becoming the first Soviet European champion in boxing. In 1954, Yengibaryan moved up to the light-welterweight division and remained at this weight. He won his first Soviet title in 1955 and would win it again in 1956 and 1958. Yengibaryan also won gold medals at the 1956 Olympics and 1957 and 1959 European Amateur Boxing Championships. He went to the 1960 Summer Olympics in Rome as a favorite, but injured a shoulder in the tournament and lost in the quarterfinals to Marian Kasprzyk.

Coaching career
Yengibaryan retired shortly after the 1960 Olympics and for more than three decades coached young boxers in Yerevan. He founded the Children and Youth Sport School, which now bears his name. Yengibaryan later became an international judge and in the 1970s represented Soviet Union in the AIBA Referee Commission. In 1992 he immigrated to the United States, where he worked as a boxing coach until his death.

Death
In his last years Yengibaryan was suffering from the Alzheimer's disease which resulted in his death at the age 81. A memorial service was held for him on February 3 in Armenia. The memorial ceremony for Yengibaryan took place at the Saint Sarkis Cathedral in Yerevan. The ceremony was attended by the Armenian Minister of Sport and President of National Olympic Committee. After the ceremony, an annual boxing tournament was dedicated to Yengibaryan. Later upon the wish of Yengibaryan's daughter his body was buried in Armenia.

See also
 List of Armenian boxers

References

External links

 databaseOlympics.com
 

1932 births
2013 deaths
Sportspeople from Yerevan
Soviet male boxers
Lightweight boxers
Light-welterweight boxers
Honoured Masters of Sport of the USSR
Recipients of the Order of the Red Banner of Labour
Olympic boxers of the Soviet Union
Boxers at the 1956 Summer Olympics
Boxers at the 1960 Summer Olympics
Olympic gold medalists for the Soviet Union
Olympic medalists in boxing
Soviet Armenians
Armenian male boxers
Medalists at the 1956 Summer Olympics
Deaths from dementia in California
Deaths from Alzheimer's disease